The 2009 Summer Universiade, officially known as the XXV Summer Universiade, was celebrated in Belgrade, Serbia from July 1 to 12, 2009. The event has also been organised by a range of co-host cities mostly in Vojvodina (Serbian Autonomous Province), close to Belgrade. It was the largest sporting event ever to be organised by the city. At this Universiade the biggest star was the Russian rhythmic gymnast Evgeniya Kanaeva, who won 5 gold medals. Russia was the leading nation in the medal table, with the most gold medals (27) and most medals (76).

The bidding process

The bidding process for the 2009 Summer Universiade games began in early 2004. Together with Belgrade another two cities bid for the event – Monterrey in Mexico and Poznań in Poland. Working in Belgrade's favour were the various major sporting events the city was awarded to host in the upcoming 2005, 2006 and 2007 such as EuroBasket 2005, the 2005 European Volleyball Championship, the 2006 European Water Polo Championship, and the European Youth Olympic Festival 2007. Furthermore, the city launched two unsuccessful candidate bids to organize the Summer Olympic Games: for the 1992 Summer Olympics Belgrade was eliminated in the third round of International Olympic Committee voting, with the games going to Barcelona. The 1996 Summer Olympics ultimately went to Atlanta.

On 10 January 2005 in Innsbruck, Austria, Belgrade was announced as the host of the 2009 Summer Universiade. The ceremony of the host city announcement was attended by the now deceased Belgrade mayor Nenad Bogdanović.

Mascot

The mascot of the 2009 Summer Universiade is a sparrow bird. The organisers chose the sparrow not only because of its symbolic ties to the host city but also because it represents a fast, dynamic and skillful bird, attributes needed for those competing at Universiade. The mascot received a new more modern look in 2009 and a competition began to name the Belgrade sparrow. The three final names for the sparrow were published in the Serbian media in April 2009, with the finalists being Srba, Cvrle and Dživdžan. The final voting was left to the 10,000 Universiade volunteers who overwhelmingly chose the name "Srba".

Venues
The 2009 Summer Universiade took place in 69 venues across Belgrade and near bycities Inđija, Novi Sad, Obrenovac, Pančevo, Smederevo, Vršac and Zrenjanin. Obrenovac hosted the water polo and volleyball competition, Inđija, Pančevo and Vršac the basketball, Novi Sad the athletics and volleyball, while Zrenjanin hosted the swimming competition. The venue for each sport can be found on the official website of the 2009 Summer Universiade in Belgrade.

The opening and closing ceremonies took place at the Belgrade Arena, with a capacity of 20,000. A range of sports halls have undergone intense reconstruction to meet standards for the Universiade games. A number of venues were also newly constructed.

 Belgrade Arena — ceremonies, basketball, gymnastics
 Stadion Crvena Zvezda — athletics
 Partizan Stadium — football (final)
 Tašmajdan Sports Centre Pool — swimming, diving
 Tašmajdan Sports Centre Tennis Court — tennis
 Belgrade Fair — judo, fencing, taekwondo
 Železnik Hall — basketball
 Železnik Stadium — football
 New Belgrade Sports Hall — basketball
 Dvorana Sumice — basketball
 FK Obilić Stadium — football
 Omladinski Stadium — football
 Lokomotiva Stadion — football
 Voždovac Stadium — football
 FK Srem Stadium — football
 FK Teleoptik Stadium — football
 FK Makiš Stadium — football
 SRK Banjica — water polo

Vršac
 Millennium Center — basketball

Novi Sad
 SPC Vojvodina — volleyball

Smederevo
 Smederevo City Stadium — football

Lazarevac
 FK Kolubara — football

Inđija
 Inđija Stadium — football

Jakovo
 FK Jakovo Stadium — football

Universiade Village
The Universiade Village was home to all athletes participating at the 2009 Summer Universiade games. Often referred to as Belville, the village has been newly built and comprises 14 buildings containing modern apartments. The Belville complex consists of a residential area comprising 120,000m², commercial and business facilities comprising 34,800m² and educational facilities comprising 6,100m². The complex also includes 22,000m² of office space. The Belville complex was completed in May 2009 and officially opened in June 2009. 2000 Apartments have been offered for sale in spring of 2008, and the new owners will be allowed to move in during October 2009.

Each building has been named after a flower. They are Iris Marigold, Dandelion, Violet, Lily of the Valley, Sunflower, Mimosa, Cyclamen, Gillyflower, Syringa, Jacinth, Rose, Tulipa, and Lily. During the construction of the village it was the largest development site in the Balkans. It is located in New Belgrade with the closest venues to it being Belgrade Arena (basketball and table tennis), EXPO XXI (taekwondo) and TK Gazela (tennis).

Sports

Participants

  (3)
  (4)
  (27)
  (3)
  (9)
  (14)
  (132)
  (32)
  (18)
  (1)
  (24)
  (27)
  (5)
  (6)
  (37)
  (17)
  (129)
  (66)
  (2)
  (211)
  (4)
  (241)
  (7)
  (2)
  (5)
  (7)
  (5)
 
  (52)
  (9)
  (21)
  (99)
  (18)
  (3)
  (8)
  (41)
  (2)
  (2)
  (59)
  (52)
  (165)
  (116)
  (41)
  (130)
  (73)
  (12)
 
  (2)
  (5)
  (40)
  (131)
  (11)
  (41)
  (70)
  (32)
  (203)
  (265)
  (13)
  (65)
  (2)
  (24)
  (175)
  (6)
  (39)
  (40)
  (5)
  (9)
  (52)
  (24)
  (3)
  (2)
  (115)
  (2)
  (102)
  (22)
  (1)
  (26)
  (46)
  (32)
  (11)
  (8)
  (20)
  (11)
  (21)
  (29)
  (12)
  (11)
  (4)
  (2)
  (4)
  (4)
  (200)
  (46)
  (1)
  (6)
  (65)
  (308)
  (29)
  (11)
  (280)
  (9)
  (41)
  (95)
  (113)
  (102)
  (14)
  (2)
  (2)
  (62)
  (56)
  (5)
  (86)
  (2)
  (1)
  (61)
  (2)
  (1)
  (88)
  (40)
  (188)
  (24)
  (107)
 
  (14)
  (13)
  (2)
  (9)
  (2)

Medal table

Schedule
{| class="wikitable" style="margin:0.5em auto; font-size:90%"
|-
| bgcolor=#00cc33 | ● || Opening Ceremony || bgcolor=#3399ff | ● || Competitions || bgcolor=#ffcc00 | ● || Finals || bgcolor=#ee3333 | ● || Closing Ceremony
|-

Broadcasting
The host broadcaster of the 2009 Summer Universiade was Serbia's RTS, the national broadcasting corporation. It used its first and second channel to broadcast the games as well as its digital channel. The games were produced and broadcast in high-definition television. Eurosport provided cable broadcasting to European nations.

References

External links

 Belgrade 2009 Summer Universiade
 FISU - Belgrade 2009 Summer Universiade

 
Universiade Summer
Summer Universiade, 2009
International sports competitions in Belgrade
Multi-sport events in Serbia
Summer World University Games
2000s in Belgrade
Summer Universiade